Victor Gu (full name Victor Gu Chian Peow, born in 1977 in Damansara Utama, Malaysia) is a former NTV7 newscaster, was an active debater at Universiti Malaya. Gu is also a member of Malaysian Chinese Association (MCA), and a DJ for Wah FM.
On NTV7, he hosted many shows, such as Bai Wan Fu Weng, the Mandarin-language Malaysian version of Who Wants to Be a Millionaire?.

Gu was chosen as Barisan Nasional (BN) candidate in the 2008 general election but he has lost.

Election results

Reality show participation
In 2015, Victor Gu has clinched the third place in I am Speaker, a reality TV series in China. He beat some 50 other contestants to reach the grand final of the show, which was aired last night on Beijing TV, after close to three months of intense battle. In his past appearances, Gu spoke passionately about Chinese education in Malaysia, justice and the death penalty.

References

1977 births
Living people
Malaysian television presenters
Malaysian male actors
Who Wants to Be a Millionaire?
Malaysian actor-politicians
Malaysian Chinese Association politicians
University of Malaya alumni